The Queensland Academy of Sport (QAS) is an elite sports institute set up in 1991 by the Queensland Government to support athletes in the state of Queensland. Its headquarters are currently located at the Queensland Sport and Athletics Centre in Nathan, Queensland.

The Academy was opened in May 1991 to rival the other states' institutes of sport and has thirteen squads over ten sports. These programs include athletics, canoeing, cycling, gymnastics (men and women), hockey (men and women), netball, rowing, sailing, swimming, and water polo (men and women).

Also QAS has many partnership programs with other team sports ranging from the Queensland Baseball Academy, to the Queensland Academy of Sport Soccer Program.

Notable alumni
Matt McKay
Robbie Kruse
Grant Hackett
Susie O'Neill
Kieren Perkins 
Stephanie Rice
Samantha Stosur
Ken Wallace
David Williams
Vicki Wilson
Cameron McEvoy
Kenny Dougall

References

External links
QAS Website
2008 QAS Annual Report
Loose Indian bowlers punished. The Age (29 November 2003)

Sport in Queensland
Universities in Queensland
1991 establishments in Australia
Australian Institute of Sport